This is a list of Danish television related events from 2001.

Events
28 January - The Danish version of Big Brother debuts on TV Danmark.
17 February - Rollo & King are selected to represent Denmark at the 2001 Eurovision Song Contest with their song "Der står et billede af dig på mit bord."
They are selected to be the thirtieth Danish Eurovision entry during Dansk Melodi Grand Prix held at the Messecenter in Herning.
10 May - The first season of Big Brother is won by Jill Liv Nielsen.
12 May - The 46th Eurovision Song Contest is held at the Parken Stadium in Copenhagen. Estonia wins the contest with the song "Everybody", performed by Tanel Padar & Dave Benton.
October - Søren Brøndum Laursen becomes the first person to win 1,000,000 kr in Hvem vil være millionær?.

Debuts

Big Brother (2001-2005, 2012-2014)

International
 CSI: Crime Scene Investigation
 Law & Order: Special Victims Unit

Television shows

1990s
Hvem vil være millionær? (1999–present)

Ending this year

Births

Deaths

See also
 2001 in Denmark